The Norwegian Association of Health and Social Care Personnel (NHS) was a trade union representing auxiliary nurses and care workers in Norway.

The union was founded in 1965 as the Norwegian Nursing Auxiliaries' Union.  In 1988, it affiliated to the Confederation of Vocational Unions, and by 1996, it had 49,692 members.  In 2003, it merged with the Norwegian Union of Municipal Employees, to form the Norwegian Union of Municipal and General Employees.

References

Healthcare trade unions
Trade unions established in 1965
Trade unions disestablished in 2003
Trade unions in Norway